Emre Can Coşkun (born 7 June 1994) is a Turkish professional footballer who plays as a centre back for Amed.

Career

Galatasaray
He was first selected in a Galatasaray matchday squad on 3 December 2013, remaining an unused substitute as they defeated Gaziantep BB in a penalty shootout after a 2–2 draw at the Türk Telekom Arena in the fourth round of the season's Turkish Cup. On 29 January 2014 he made his professional debut in the group stage of that competition, replacing Salih Dursun for the last 12 minutes of a 3–0 home win against Elazığspor. Three days before that, he was an unused substitute in a goalless league draw away to Gaziantepspor. On 12 February, again in the Cup group, he made his first start in a goalless home draw against Antalyaspor, making way for Guillermo Burdisso after 66 minutes. Galatasaray eventually won the trophy, but Coşkun played no further part in the season.

Loan to Denizlispor
On 2 February 2015, he was loaned to Denizlispor for the remainder of the season. On 30 June 2015, he returned to Galatasaray.

Loan to Alanyaspor
On 5 August 2015, he was loaned to Alanyaspor for the upcoming campaign. On 9 January 2016, Alanyaspor cancelled his contract, and he returned to Galatasaray. On 28 November 2015, he scored a goal against Kardemir Karabükspor, in a match which ended with a 1–1 draw.

Loan to Giresunspor
On 12 January 2016, Emre Can was loaned to Giresunspor for making progress.

Göztepe
He was signed by (then) second-tier club Göztepe in the summer of 2016. The upcoming season he gained promotion with the club to the top tier of Turkish football.

Loan to Adanaspor
He was loaned to second-tier club Adanaspor for the second part of the 2017–18 season.

References

External links
 
 
 Player's profile, TFF.org.tr 

1994 births
People from Şişli
Footballers from Istanbul
Living people
Turkish footballers
Turkey youth international footballers
Turkey under-21 international footballers
Association football central defenders
Association football defenders
Galatasaray S.K. footballers
Denizlispor footballers
Alanyaspor footballers
Giresunspor footballers
Göztepe S.K. footballers
Adanaspor footballers
Utaş Uşakspor footballers
TFF First League players
TFF Second League players